Robert, Robbie, Rob, Bob, or Bobby Hart may refer to:

Sportspeople
 Bobby Hart (American football) (born 1994), U.S. American football player
 Rob Hart (born 1976), UK American football player
 Bob Hart (umpire) (1879–1937), American baseball official
 Robbie Hart (born 1947), England association football referee
 Robbie Hart (cricketer) (born 1974), New Zealand cricketer
 Bobby Hart (wrestler) (1938–2001), American professional wrestler; see NWA Mid-America

Musicians
 Bob Hart (bassist), American bass player
 Bob Hart (1900–1993), a.k.a. Al Trace, American musician
 Bobby Hart (songwriter) (born 1939), American songwriter
 Robert Hart (musician) (born 1958), English musician

Politicians
 Robert Hart (politician) (1814–1894), New Zealand politician
 Sir Robert Hart, 1st Baronet (1835–1911), British diplomat in China

Others
 Robbie Hart, a character in the 1998 film The Wedding Singer
 Robert Hart (horticulturist) (1913–2000), British gardener
 Rob Hart (author), see Bouchercon XLVII

See also
 Robert Harte (disambiguation)